Rebel in Paradise may refer to:

 Rebel in Paradise (film), 1960 documentary about the artist Paul Gauguin
 Rebel in Paradise: A Biography of Emma Goldman, 1961 biography by Richard Drinnon